Goniophylla is a monotypic moth genus of the family Erebidae. Its only species, Goniophylla fragilis, is known from the Australian state of Queensland. Both the genus and species were first described by Turner in 1945.

References

Acontiinae
Monotypic moth genera